The Cherrylume Iron Lady Warriors are a professional women's volleyball team owned by Mileage Asia Corporation playing in the Philippine Superliga. The team is composed of players from the University of the East volleyball team.

Current roster
For the 2018 PSL Invitational Cup:

Head coach
  Rodrigo Roque
Assistant coaches
  Jerome Guhit
  Melvin Reyes
| valign="top" |

Physical Therapist/Trainer
   Danica Galvez

Team manager
  Elmer Ngo

Previous roster

For the 2017 PSL All-Filipino Conference:

Head coach
  Lerma Giron
Assistant coaches
  Lawrence Ngo
  Elmer Ngo
Team manager
  Melvin Reyes
| valign="top" |

Doctor
   Jose Mari Angulo
Physical Therapist
   Ann Garmela Gilpo

 Team Captain
 Import
 Draft Pick
 Rookie
 Inactive
 Suspended
 Free Agent
 Injured

Honours

Team

Team captains
 Mary Anne Mendrez (2017)
 Lhara May Clavano (2018)

Coaches
 Lerma Giron (2017)
 Rodrigo Roque (2018)

References 

Women's volleyball teams in the Philippines
Philippine Super Liga
2017 establishments in the Philippines
Volleyball clubs established in 2017